Elne Cathedral is a Roman Catholic church and former cathedral located in the town of Elne in the County of Roussillon, France.

It was the seat of the former Bishopric of Elne, which was transferred to the Bishopric and cathedral of Perpignan in 1601.

The cathedral was consecrated in 1069. In 1285, during the Aragonese Crusade, French troops sacked the town and massacred the townspeople who had taken refuge in the cathedral.

Gallery

External links

Location of the cathedral

Churches in Pyrénées-Orientales
Former cathedrals in France
Romanesque architecture in France
Monuments historiques of Pyrénées-Orientales